Some Kind of Beautiful (Canadian title: How to Make Love Like an Englishman, UK title: Lessons in Love, European title:  Teach Me Love) is a 2014 American romantic comedy film written by Matthew Newman, directed by Tom Vaughan, and starring Pierce Brosnan, Jessica Alba and Salma Hayek. It was produced by Kevin Frakes and Richard Lewis.

Plot
By day, Richard Haig (Pierce Brosnan) is a successful and well-respected English professor in the UK. By night, Richard indulges his own romantic fantasies with a steady stream of beautiful undergraduates. So when Kate (Jessica Alba), Richard's stunning, athletic, 25-year-old American girlfriend tells him that she is pregnant, Richard is shocked. Putting his wandering eye behind him, he marries her and agrees to move to Los Angeles to start their family. It doesn't take long for Richard to realize that his past is hard to escape, as is the toll his strained relationship with his dysfunctional father has had on him. Meanwhile, Kate tells Richard that she has developed feelings for someone else. They separate and Richard is now free to move on with Kate's sister Olivia (Salma Hayek), with whom he has been in love with since before he married Kate. Olivia and Richard start dating soon after.

Cast

Production
Jessica Alba, Pierce Brosnan and Kristin Scott Thomas were the first to be cast in May. Thomas later dropped out and was replaced by Salma Hayek. Ben McKenzie joined the cast on October 17.

Filming
The film was shot for 25 days, production started filming in Los Angeles on October 14, 2013 and ended on November 9, 2013.

Release
The film had its world premiere at the AFM on November 6, 2014. The film was released in Denmark on June 4, 2015. The film was  released on DirecTV on July 23, 2015, prior to being released in a limited release and through video on demand on August 21, 2015.

Reception
The film received overwhelmingly negative reviews. Rotten Tomatoes gives the film a 6% rating based on 34 reviews, with an average rating of 3.25/10. The site's critics consensus reads: "Stranding Pierce Brosnan as a charmless cad, this tone-deaf romantic comedy is Some Kind Of something, but it definitely isn't beautiful." Metacritic gives the film a weighted average score of 11% based on reviews from 9 critics, indicating "overwhelming dislike".

References

External links
 
 
 
 
 

2014 romantic comedy films
2014 films
American romantic comedy films
Films directed by Tom Vaughan (director)
Films scored by David Newman
Films shot in Los Angeles
Saban Films films
2010s English-language films
2010s American films